International Seon Center is a Buddhist temple in Yangcheon-gu in Seoul, South Korea. It opened in November 2010 under direct management of the Jogye Order of Korean Buddhism.

It is located near Yangcheon Park, the Anyangcheon river and the Seonyudo Island.

The Center provides programs for visitors on Buddhist and traditional culture such as Ganhwa Seon practice, Seon cultural classes and temple food. It also offers temple stay programs where visitors can experience Buddhist culture.

Gallery

References

External links  
 International Seon Center official website

Buddhist temples in Seoul